Haplochromis thuragnathus is a species of cichlid endemic to Lake Victoria in Africa.  This species reaches a length of  SL.

References

thuragnathus
Fish described in 1967
Fish of Lake Victoria
Taxonomy articles created by Polbot